In Dub may refer to:

 In Dub (Hallucinogen album), 2002
 ...In Dub, a 2004 album by Meat Beat Manifesto
 In Dub – Live, a 2009 album by Hallucinogen